Dov Joseph Elkabas (born 5 November 1968), known professionally as DJ The Prophet, is an Israeli-Dutch hardcore techno and hardstyle DJ and producer. The Prophet is also the owner of one of the largest hardstyle record labels, Scantraxx.

Biography
The Prophet started his career as a DJ in 1983 after he discovered turntables at a disco in Amsterdam. He was working in a hotel at the time, and performing as DJ on the side. He was asked to choose, and made the choice to DJ full-time. He started spinning hip hop music before a switch to house in 1988. About three years later, he set up a team of DJs known as "The Dreamteam", together with DJ Dano, Buzz Fuzz and Gizmo. The team was a huge success in the gabber scene.

Later, The Prophet switched from hardcore to hardstyle because he did not like the fact that the hardcore community wanted the music to become 'harder'. He is famous both as a DJ and as a producer. He is also the owner of Scantraxx Records, one of the largest Dutch hardstyle record labels.

His productions were released on vinyl and CDs on labels such as ID&T or Q-dance. He is also behind many DJ mixes which were published on CDs, such as the Thunderdome CDs, and he was involved in projects including Hardheadz (along with DJ Pavo) and Punk Brozz (with DJ Zany).

In 2014 he released his first album, Louder, which took about nine months to produce.

As of most recent, The Prophet announcing his retirement after more than three decades of making music & deejaying across the globe. He will be doing so once he concluded his "From The Hard" tour visit, which include the upcoming edition of Defqon.1 Weekend Festival as his final destination.

Albums

Singles

References

External links 

Official homepage
Official website of Scantraxx Recordz
Full Discography on Discogs.com

1968 births
Living people
Dutch dance musicians
Dutch DJs
Dutch electronic musicians
Hardcore techno musicians
Hardstyle musicians
Musicians from Amsterdam
Electronic dance music DJs